An Internet hosting service is a service that runs servers connected to the Internet, allowing organizations and individuals to serve content or host services connected to the Internet. 

A common kind of hosting is web hosting. Most hosting providers offer a combination of services  e-mail hosting, website hosting, and database hosting, for example. DNS hosting service, another type of service usually provided by hosting providers, is often bundled with domain name registration. 

Dedicated server hosts, provide a server, usually housed in a datacenter and connected to the Internet where clients can run anything they want (including web servers and other servers). The hosting provider ensures that the servers have Internet connections with good upstream bandwidth and reliable power sources. 

Another popular kind of hosting service is shared hosting. This is a type of web hosting service, where the hosting provider provisions hosting services for multiple clients on one physical server and share the resources between the clients. Virtualization is key to making this work effectively.

Types of hosting service

Full-featured hosting services

Full-featured hosting services include:
 Complex managed hosting, applies to both physical dedicated servers and virtual servers, with many companies choosing a hybrid (a combination of physical and virtual) hosting solution. There are many similarities between standard and complex managed hosting but the key difference is the level of administrative and engineering support that the customer pays for – owing to both the increased size and complexity of the infrastructure deployment. The provider steps in to take over most of the management, including security, memory, storage, and IT support. The service is primarily proactive. 
 Dedicated hosting service, also called managed to host service, where the hosting service provider owns and manages the machine, leasing full control to the client.  Management of the server can include monitoring to ensure the server continues to work effectively, backup services, installation of security patches, and various levels of technical support.
 Virtual private server, in which virtualization technology is employed to allow multiple logical servers to run on a single physical server
 Colocation facilities provide just the Internet connection, uninterruptible power, and climate control, but let the client do his system administration.
 Cloud hosting, which can also be termed time-share or on-demand hosting, in which the user only pays for the system time and space used, and capacity can be quickly scaled up or down as computing requirements change. The hosting provider normally charges for the power and also space used in the datacentre.

Other
Limited or application-specific hosting services include:
 File hosting service
 Web hosting service
 E-mail hosting service
 DNS hosting service
 Game servers
 Wiki farms
 Colocation center

Bandwidth cost
Internet hosting services include the required Internet connection; they may charge a flat rate per month or charge per bandwidth used  a common payment plan is to sell a predetermined amount of bandwidth and charge for any 'overage' (Usage above the predetermined limit) the customer may incur on a per GB (Gigabyte) basis. The overage charge would be agreed upon at the start of the contract.

Patent dispute
Web hosting technology has been causing some controversy, as Web.com claims that it holds patent rights to some common hosting technologies, including the use of a web-based control panel to manage the hosting service, with its 19 patents. In addition, Web.com sued GoDaddy as well for similar patent infringement.

See also
 Internet service provider
 Application service provider
 Hosted service provider
 Utility computing
 Green hosting
 Cloud storage
 Hybrid server
 Infrastructure as a service
 Bulletproof hosting

References

Internet hosting